Pseudosaica is a genus of assassin bugs in the family Reduviidae. There are at least two described species in Pseudosaica.

Species
These two species belong to the genus Pseudosaica:
 Pseudosaica florida (Barber, 1914)
 Pseudosaica panamaensis Blinn, 1990

References

Further reading

 
 
 
 

Reduviidae
Articles created by Qbugbot